Pseudalus is a genus of moths in the subfamily Arctiinae. The genus was described by Schaus in 1896.

Species
 Pseudalus affinis Rothschild, 1933
 Pseudalus aurantiacus Rothschild, 1909
 Pseudalus leos Druce, 1898
 Pseudalus limona Schaus, 1896
 Pseudalus salmonaceus Rothschild, 1909
 Pseudalus strigatus Rothschild, 1909

Former species
 Pseudalus pseudidalus Rothschild, 1909

References

Arctiini
Moth genera